James Brown is an English magician from Dorset.

He was awarded The Magic Circle close-up magician of the year in 2006  and also came second in the 2006 International Magic Convention Close-Up competition .  His style of magic is a cross between close-up magic hypnosis and pickpocketing, all presented in a humorous manner.

External links 
James Brown's official site
A review of one of James' lectures

Living people
English magicians
Year of birth missing (living people)